John Woolf may refer to:
 John Woolf (producer), British film producer, with his brother James
 John Elgin Woolf, American architect
 John William Woolf, Canadian politician

See also
 John Wolf (disambiguation)
 John Woolfe, British racing driver